The 1980 Champion of Champions was a professional non-ranking snooker tournament held from 2–12 October 1980 at the New London Theatre in Drury Lane, London.

Summary
10 players contested the event, divided into two groups of 5. Within each group everyone played all the others in a round robin format. The winners of the groups played in the 19-frame final. In the round-robin stage matches were over 9 frames with all frames played, even after the match had been won. The New London Theatre had hosted the Masters between 1976 and 1978.

Group B was completed first. Terry Griffiths needed to win his last two matches by good margins to finish ahead of Doug Mountjoy. He led Graham Miles  5–1 but eventually only won 6–3. This result left him having to beat Mountjoy by at least 6–3 to qualify. Mountjoy took a 4–3 lead and, although Griffiths won the match 5–4, Mountjoy qualified for the final. In group A, John Virgo won all his matches 5–4 to qualify ahead of Steve Davis. In the final Virgo took a 3–0 lead but Mountjoy fought back to be just 5–4 behind after the afternoon session. In the evening session the match was level at 8–8 before Mountjoy won the next two frames to win the match in front of a crowd of 700.

The playing of "dead" frames was not popular with the players. In the first match of the tournament Steve Davis beat Dennis Taylor 5–0 but then lost the last 4 frames. He later complained that it was difficult to motivate himself after winning the match.

The tournament was not broadcast. Later in October the same venue was used for the 1980 edition of the State Express World Challenge Cup which was covered on BBC television. With no TV coverage and no sponsor the Champion of Champions was dropped from the schedule.

Players
The following 10 players competed in the tournament:

Group A

 Ray Reardon
 Steve Davis
 Kirk Stevens
 Dennis Taylor
 John Virgo

Group B

 Terry Griffiths
 Alex Higgins
 Graham Miles
 Doug Mountjoy
 Cliff Thorburn

Round-robin stage

Group A
John Virgo won all four of his matches 5–4 to qualify for the final.

Table

Results:
(2 Oct)  Steve Davis 5–4 Dennis Taylor
(2 Oct) John Virgo 5–4 Kirk Stevens
(3 Oct) John Virgo 5–4 Dennis Taylor  
(3 Oct) Steve Davis 7–2 Kirk Stevens
(9 Oct) John Virgo 5–4 Steve Davis  
(9 Oct) Ray Reardon 5–4 Dennis Taylor
(10 Oct) John Virgo 5–4 Ray Reardon  
(10 Oct) Dennis Taylor w/o Kirk Stevens
(11 Oct) Ray Reardon 7–2 Kirk Stevens  
 (11 Oct) Steve Davis 5–4 Ray Reardon

Kirk Stevens did not turn up for his match against Dennis Taylor. Taylor played an exhibition match against Perrie Mans, who played with a borrowed cue. In the table above a 9–0 result is used for this match.

Group B
Doug Mountjoy lost his final match to Terry Griffiths 5–4 but qualified by winning more frames overall.

Table

Results:
(4 Oct) Graham Miles 5–4 Alex Higgins
(4 Oct) Doug Mountjoy 7–2 Alex Higgins
(5 Oct) Alex Higgins 5–4 Terry Griffiths
(5 Oct) Terry Griffiths 8–1 Cliff Thorburn
(6 Oct) Doug Mountjoy 6–3 Graham Miles
(6 Oct) Alex Higgins 5–4 Cliff Thorburn
(7 Oct) Doug Mountjoy 8–1 Cliff Thorburn
(7 Oct) Cliff Thorburn 5–4 Graham Miles
(8 Oct) Terry Griffiths 6–3 Graham Miles
(8 Oct) Terry Griffiths 5–4 Doug Mountjoy

Final

Century breaks
The following century breaks were made during the tournament:
 128, 100  Steve Davis
 119, 100  John Virgo
 114  Alex Higgins
 101  Doug Mountjoy
 100  Kirk Stevens

References

1980
1980 in snooker
1980 in English sport
1980 sports events in London
October 1980 sports events in the United Kingdom
International sports competitions in London